"Broken Glass" is a song by Norwegian DJ Kygo and German singer-songwriter Kim Petras. It was released on 28 May 2020 by Sony Music from Kygo's third studio album Golden Hour.

Music video
The music video was released on July 10, 2020, directed by GriffinStoddard. Petras is shown amongst the wreckage of a car in the snowy dark, with her appearance evolving into a "Mad Max-meets-Elsa from Frozen ice queen, ready to take on everything the storm has to throw at her", according to Billboard.

Charts

Weekly charts

Year-end charts

References

2020 songs
Kygo songs
Kim Petras songs
Songs written by Dr. Luke
Songs written by Kim Petras
Sony Music singles
Songs written by Kygo
Songs written by Fransisca Hall
Songs written by Sam Sumser
Songs written by Sean Small